Maricé Morales (born June 12, 1987) is an attorney and a politician from Montgomery County, Maryland. She represented District 19 in the Maryland House of Delegates and is currently running for Montgomery County Council District 6.

Early life and education

Maricé Ivette Morales was born in Arlington, Virginia, in 1987. Her father is from Chimbote, Peru, and her mother is from Chiclayo, Peru. She lived in Peru from age 12 to 17, when she returned to the United States to attend college.

Morales graduated from George Mason University with a bachelor's degree in Global Affairs and French and a master's degree in public policy. She received a Juris Doctor from the University of Maryland School of Law and received a public service award from the law school. While in law school, Morales competed in the National Latina/o Law Student Association's sixth annual moot court competition.

Career

Morales served as Senate Special Assistant to District 19 Senator Roger Manno. She also worked as a prevailing wage investigator for the District of Columbia Building Construction Trades Council.

Morales ran for the Maryland House of Delegates in 2014, to represent the state's 19th legislative district, which includes parts of Silver Spring, Aspen Hill, and Gaithersburg. She ran to replace Sam Arora, who did not seek reelection.

Morales supports equal educational opportunities for all Marylanders. She also emphasizes labor laws protecting immigrants from exploitation. Her candidacy was endorsed by CASA in Action, Maryland State and District of Columbia AFL-CIO, Montgomery County Volunteer Fire and Rescue Association, Fraternal Order of Police Lodge 35, United Auto Workers, United Food and Commercial Workers Local 1994, NARAL Pro-Choice Maryland PAC, American Federation of State, County and Municipal Employees Maryland, Maryland Votes for Animals, and Maryland League of Conservation Voters. The Washington Post's editorial board endorsed her campaign.

Morales won the general election, and her term of office began on January 14, 2015.

For her first term of office, Morales is a member of the Judiciary Committee, the Criminal Justice Subcommittee of the Judiciary Committee, the Family Law Subcommittee of the Judiciary Committee, and the Women Legislators of Maryland. In addition, Morales joined the newly formed Maryland Latino Legislative Caucus, a caucus formed to express the views of the Latino community, increase Latino voting, support Latino businesses, and support Latinos in local leadership.

Morales co-sponsored the "Death with Dignity Act", which would allow a licensed health care professional to withhold or withdraw a medically administered life-sustaining procedure to an adult with a terminal illness if the person requests so, both orally and in writing, witnessed by two individuals. The Death with Dignity National Center supports the bill, calling it a tremendous comfort to patients who are terminally ill and to their families. The Maryland Catholic Conference is opposed to the bill, saying the bill does not require medical professionals to assess the patient for depression, it does not require an independent witness when administering the dose, and it does not require patients to notify family members.

Morales sponsored the Maryland Law Enforcement and Governmental Trust Act, which would have left immigration enforcement to federal authorities rather than state and local police. It also would have required federal authorities to have a warrant in order to transfer an undocumented immigrant from state or local authorities to federal authorities. The aim of the bill was to help undocumented immigrants feel like they can call the police or 911 when they are a victims of a crime without being afraid of being arrested themselves on immigration charges. State and local police could still arrest and detain perpetrators of state and local crimes, regardless of their immigration status. The Trust Act passed the Maryland House of Delegates, but the Maryland Senate did not vote on it, and it did not become law.

Morales was a member of the Workgroup to Study Safe Harbor Policy for Youth Victims of Human Trafficking. The Workgroup is studying the subject of minors who are victims of human trafficking and what legal protections and services Maryland should offer them.

Morales did not win reelection in 2018. In the Democratic primary election, where the top three candidates advance to the general election, Morales came in fourth place with 16 percent of the vote.

After the election, Morales started a law firm that specializes in immigration law, criminal law, accidents, traffic violations, and DUIs.

In 2019, Governor Larry Hogan appointed Morales to the board of trustees of Montgomery College. Her six-year term began in 2019. Morales also serves on the board of directors of Emerge Maryland, an organization that recruits and trains women to run for elected office as Democrats in Maryland.

Morales is running to represent District 6 on the Montgomery County Council in the 2022 election.

Election history

2014 primary election

2014 general election

2018 primary election

References

External links
Campaign website

1987 births
American lawyers
American politicians of Peruvian descent
George Mason University alumni
Hispanic and Latino American state legislators in Maryland
Hispanic and Latino American women in politics
Living people
Democratic Party members of the Maryland House of Delegates
People from Arlington County, Virginia
People from Silver Spring, Maryland
University of Maryland Francis King Carey School of Law alumni
Women state legislators in Maryland
21st-century American politicians
21st-century American women politicians